Mihaela E. Plesa (born July 28, 1983) is an American politician who is the Representative for Texas's 70th House of Representatives district, following the 2022 Texas House of Representatives election. Her district covers parts of Collin County. She is a member of the Democratic Party.

Election history

2022

References

External links

Living people
1983 births
Democratic Party members of the Texas House of Representatives
Women state legislators in Texas
People from Plano, Texas
21st-century American politicians
21st-century American women politicians
American people of Romanian descent